"Sonnet X", also known by its opening words as "Death Be Not Proud", is a fourteen-line poem, or sonnet, by English poet John Donne (1572–1631), one of the leading figures in the metaphysical poets group of seventeenth-century English literature. Written between February and August 1609, it was first published posthumously in 1633.

It is included as one of the nineteen sonnets that comprise Donne's Holy Sonnets or Divine Meditations, among his best-known works. Most editions number the poem as the tenth in the sonnet sequence, which follows the order of poems in the Westmoreland Manuscript, the most complete arrangement of the cycle, discovered in the late nineteenth century. However, two editions published shortly after Donne's death include the sonnets in a different order, where this poem appears as eleventh in the Songs and Sonnets (published 1633) and sixth in Divine Meditations (published 1635).

"Death Be Not Proud" presents an argument against the power of death. Addressing Death as a person, the speaker warns Death against pride in his power. Such power is merely an illusion, and the end Death thinks it brings to men and women is in fact a rest from world-weariness for its alleged "victims." The poet criticizes Death as a slave to other forces: fate, chance, kings, and desperate men. Death is not in control, for a variety of other powers exercise their volition in taking lives. Even in the rest it brings, Death is inferior to drugs. Finally, the speaker predicts the end of Death itself, stating "Death, thou shalt die."

Poem

Donne had a major illness that brought him close to death during his eighth year as an Anglican minister. The illness may have been typhoid fever, but in recent years it has been shown that he may have had a relapsing fever in combination with other illnesses.

The sonnet has an ABBA ABBA CDDC EE rhyme scheme ("eternalLY" is meant to rhyme with "DIE").

The last line alludes to 1 Corinthians 15:26: "The last enemy that shall be destroyed is death".

The poem's opening words are echoed in a contemporary poem, "Death be not proud, thy hand gave not this blow", sometimes attributed to Donne, but more likely by his patron Lucy Harington Russell, Countess of Bedford.

Notable use in pop culture 

Death Be Not Proud (1949) by John Gunther, is a memoir of his son's struggle with — and ultimately death from — a brain tumor.

"Death Be Not Proud" was partially recited by Jason Miller as Patient X in the film The Exorcist III.

The first two and last two lines of "Death Be Not Proud" are recited by Paladin in The Prophet (Episode 16, Season 3 of Have Gun - Will Travel).

The poem was set for voice and piano by Benjamin Britten as the concluding song in his song cycle The Holy Sonnets of John Donne.

In the Pulitzer Prize–winning play Wit by Margaret Edson (and the film adaptation with Emma Thompson), the sonnet plays a central role.

The first two lines are recited at the beginning of the title track to Children of Bodom's third album Follow the Reaper.

The poem is recited in its entirety by Kenneth Branagh at the end of Episode 4 of the 1987 BBC series Fortunes of War, following the death of one of the main characters.

The title of the 1981 hostage drama film Kings and Desperate Men starring Patrick McGoohan, Alexis Kanner and Margaret Trudeau is taken from the poem and McGoohan recites part of it in the film.

In The Simpsons episode "HOMR," Homer Simpson mentions reading the poem. Additionally, the season 7 episode "Marge Be Not Proud" derives its title from the poem.

Plot keystone, and last lines, in the 1984 film The Hit.

In Inside No. 9, Series 5, episode "Death Be Not Proud", the last two lines are recited.

In MacGruber, within the first episode, the main character unsuccessfully recites it.

The name of the fifth volume of the light novel "86: Eighty Six" by Asato Asato.

References

Sources
Schaper, Arthur. "Poetry Analysis: 'Death Be Not Proud' By John Donne". Classical Poets, 2013. Accessed 24 February 2020.

Further reading
John Donne, Devotions upon Emergent Occasions, ed. by Anthony Raspa (Montreal: McGill-Queen's University Press, 1975), xii–xiv.
Charles M. Coffin's ed. Donne's poetry, The Complete Poetry and Selected Prose of John Donne (New York: The Modern Library, 1952

External links

 "Death Be Not Proud" in Representative Poetry Online 
 http://www.cummingsstudyguides.net/Guides3/DeathBe.html
 http://www.poets.org/viewmedia.php/prmMID/15836
 

1609 poems
1633 poems
Poetry by John Donne
Poems about death
Poems published posthumously